Afonso de Paiva (c. 1443 – c. 1490) was a Portuguese diplomat and explorer of Ethiopia and the Barbary Coast together with Pêro da Covilhã. According to James Bruce, Afonso left Pêro da Covilhã at Aden, and proceeded to Suakin where he hoped to join a caravan to his destination. The further details of his life are not recorded. Bruce writes, "only that De Paiva, attempting his journey this way, lost his life, and was never more heard of."

References

Paiva, Afonso de
Paiva, Afonso de
Portuguese diplomats
1460s births
Year of death unknown
1490s deaths
15th-century Portuguese people
People from Castelo Branco, Portugal